Mount Hunt may refer to:

Mount Hunt (Antarctica)
Mount Hunt (Wyoming), a mountain peak in Grand Teton National Park, Wyoming, USA